Lucius Benedict Peck (November 17, 1802 – December 28, 1866) was an American lawyer and politician. He served as a  U.S. Representative from Vermont.

Biography
Peck was born in Waterbury, Vermont, to General John Peck and Anna Benedict Peck. He pursued classical studies and attended the United States Military Academy in West Point, New York, for one year, before resigning due to poor health. He studied law with Vermont Supreme Court Justice Samuel Prentiss, and was admitted to the bar in 1825. Peck began the practice of law in Barre. He served as a member of the Vermont House of Representatives in 1838 and 1839. Peck moved to Montpelier, where he continued practicing law.

Peck was elected as a Democrat to the Thirtieth and Thirty-first Congresses, serving from March 4, 1847, until March 3, 1851. During the Thirty-first Congress, he served as chairman of the Committee on Manufactures. Peck did not seek renomination in 1850, and was an unsuccessful candidate for Governor of Vermont. Following the election for governor, Peck resumed the practice of law.

In 1852 Peck was a delegate to the Democratic National Convention. Appointed by President Franklin Pierce, Peck served as the United States Attorney for the District of Vermont from 1853 until 1857. From 1859 until his death in 1866, Peck served as President of the Vermont and Canada Railroad. In 1864, Peck was counsel for the banks robbed in the St. Albans Raid.

Personal life
Peck married Martha Day on May 22, 1832, and they had one daughter named Mary.

Death
Peck died on December 28, 1866, in Lowell, Massachusetts, and is interred in Green Mount Cemetery in Montpelier.

References

External links

 Biographical Directory of the United States Congress
 Govtrack.us
 The Political Graveyard
 
 History50States.com

1802 births
1866 deaths
People from Barre, Vermont
People from Montpelier, Vermont
Democratic Party members of the Vermont House of Representatives
United States Attorneys for the District of Vermont
United States Military Academy alumni
Democratic Party members of the United States House of Representatives from Vermont
19th-century American politicians
Burials at Green Mount Cemetery (Montpelier, Vermont)